John McRory (1834 – August 17, 1893) was a merchant and political figure in Ontario, Canada. He represented Addington in the House of Commons of Canada from 1879 to 1882 as a Conservative member.

He was born in Kingston Township, Upper Canada, the son of Matthew T. McRory, an Irish immigrant. He was educated in Kingston. In 1856, he married Miriam Wood. McRory served as reeve for Kingston Township from 1865 to 1877 and was the warden for Frontenac County in 1876.

References 
 
The Canadian parliamentary companion and annual register, 1880, CH Mackintosh

1834 births
1893 deaths
Members of the House of Commons of Canada from Ontario
Conservative Party of Canada (1867–1942) MPs